Vladimiras Beriozovas (29 September 1929 – 16 March 2016) was a Lithuanian politician.  In 1990 he was among those who signed the Act of the Re-Establishment of the State of Lithuania.

References

1929 births
2016 deaths
Lithuanian politicians
Members of the Supreme Soviet of the Soviet Union
Members of the Seimas
Signatories of the Act of the Re-Establishment of the State of Lithuania